The Sabah International Convention Centre (SICC) is the largest waterfront purpose-built facility in East Malaysia and also the largest convention centre in Borneo island.

SICC is the main convention and exhibition facility serving Kota Kinabalu City, the other two are Sabah Trade Centre and Sutera Harbour convention facility.

Description 
The  multi-functional complex spreads over five levels, a convention hall with a retractable partition system dividing into three sections, each multi-purpose hall catering up to 2000 delegates; offering a combined floor space of  including an extensive pre-function area. On a separate level, three contiguous exhibit halls encompassing a  flexible event space, six meeting rooms and private lounges. The top floor is dedicated to 12 individual private meeting rooms, a performance arts hall with seating capacity of 1,250 in a two-tier amphitheater accompanied by VIP rooms and lounges.

Facilities 

The convention centre has the following facilities:

SICC Café 
This cafe is located on Level 3, in the main lobby.

Convention hall (Sipadan I, II & III) 
The convention hall has removable partitions which splits the room into three; offering a classroom style capacity of 792 in each hall. This includes a pre-function hall outside with a capacity of up to 68 booths.

Exhibition hall (Kinabatangan I, II & III) 
The exhibition halls are located on Level 2. The multi-purpose hall is used for exhibitions, banquets, sports and other entertainment events. Across from the pre-function area are six separate meeting room of various sizes with addition to a private VVIP lounge.

References 

Buildings and structures in Kota Kinabalu
Convention centres in Malaysia